Bhagyashree Mote is an Indian actress. She mainly works in Hindi, Marathi and South industry.

Biography 
She is originally from Pune, Maharashtra but now lives in Mumbai. She has degree in Economics. She is known for her performance in Devon Ka Dev Mahadev and Siya Ke Ram. Her marathi debut was with the Devyani serial. At the college, she acted in commercial plays like Vishwagarjana. She is also seen in South Indian movies.

Filmography 
All films are in Marathi, otherwise noted the language

Television

References

External links 
 Bhagyashree Mote on IMDb

Living people
Actresses in Hindi television
Actresses in Hindi cinema
Actresses in Marathi television
21st-century Indian actresses
Year of birth missing (living people)